The "Proteza koniecpolska" (literally "Koniecpol prosthesis") is a colloquial term for a rail link in Poland completed in 2013 to give Częstochowa improved connections with Warsaw, Wrocław and Opole. 

The link connects the already-modernised Central Rail Line (near Włoszczowa) and the E 30 Railway (Wrocław-Opole) by means of a modernised standard-gauge track designed for speeds up to 120 and 140 km/h. A Pendolino train needs 3h 37 min for Wrocław Główny-Warsawa Centralna and IC 3 h 46 min. (January 2019)

References

External links

Railway lines in Poland